Lauro Müller Futebol Clube, commonly known as Lauro Müller, was a Brazilian football club based in Itajaí, Santa Catarina state. They won the Campeonato Catarinense once.

History
The club was founded on July 23, 1924. Lauro Müller won the Campeonato Catarinense in 1931. The club's football department was incorporated to Clube Náutico Almirante Barroso's football department on March 7, 1951.

Achievements

 Campeonato Catarinense:
 Winners (1): 1931

Stadium
Lauro Müller Futebol Clube played their home games at Estádio Aníbal Torres Costa. The stadium had a maximum capacity of 15,000 people.

References

Association football clubs established in 1924
Association football clubs disestablished in 1951
Defunct football clubs in Santa Catarina (state)
1924 establishments in Brazil
1951 disestablishments in Brazil